Ain Al-Tamur Stadium is a multi-purpose stadium in Ayn al-Tamr, 86 km west of Karbala, Iraq. It is currently used mostly for football matches and serves as the home stadium of Ain Al-Tamur SC. The stadium holds 2,000 people.

See also 
List of football stadiums in Iraq

References

Football venues in Iraq
Multi-purpose stadiums in Iraq
Athletics (track and field) venues in Iraq
Buildings and structures in Karbala
Sports venues completed in 2019
2019 establishments in Iraq